Abidar is a mountain to the West of Sanandaj, in Rojhelat of Kurdistan, situated in Iran.  With an elevation of 2550 metres, Mount Abidar is made of Upper Cretaceous rocks and is located in the Sanandaj-Sirjan geological and structural zone. This mountain is the place where the residents of Sanandaj go hiking and has many beautiful sub parks like "Emîriye" Jungle Park. Awyer main Jungle Park was designed and renewed in 1995 by the mayor of the time, Ardavan Nosoudi. He built and designed new roads to the highest places of the mount to increase the accessibility even for older people, without destroying the original view.

Abidar outdoor Cinema

Abidar Open Air Cinema, one of the world's biggest outdoor cinemas was built over the Amireih valley by mayor Ardavan Nosoudi in 1995. There used to show a movie every Friday. Until just a few years ago, the only video that could be played in the Abidar cinema was by 35 mm movie projectors and using other sources like TV, DVD, etc. was not possible. The sound was then broadcast through the transmitter, people were listening through radio using FM broadcast band frequency but that was not comfortable because of the audio and video was not synchronize. The Municipality recently switched from 35mm film to Digital Cinema projector. 
Using DLP Cinema offers a perfect resolution in 3D with bright, stunning clarity. (Precise 2K (2048 x AIRSCREEN screen surface size is90x38ft / 27x11.5m and distance of facilities from cinema is 47m. Audio is provided by the Community R2 loudspeakers 3-way, triaxial, full-range systems. Sound can be heard from three hundred meters away. With the amplifier rated at approximately 400 watts and the frequency response 70 Hz to 16 kHz ±1 dB, sound can be heard up to about 300 meter away.

References

Landforms of Kurdistan Province
Iranian Kurdistan
Mountains of Kurdistan
Zagros Mountains